Matteo Tosatto (born 14 May 1974 in Castelfranco Veneto) is an Italian former road racing cyclist. He rode as a professional between 1997 and 2016, with his biggest personal victories coming in stages of the Giro d'Italia and the Tour de France. He contested 34 Grand Tours during his career, finishing 28 of them.

Major results

1996
 1st Stage 9 Girobio
1997
 7th Rund um Köln
1998
 1st Giro del Medio Brenta
 3rd Overall Tour of Austria
 5th Veenendaal–Veenendaal
 5th GP Rik Van Steenbergen
1999
 4th Grand Prix Pino Cerami
 7th Brabantse Pijl
 9th Clásica de Almería
2000
 1st Stage 4 Paris–Nice
 2nd Rund um den Henninger Turm
 3rd Giro della Romagna
 6th Gran Premio della Costa Etruschi
2001
 1st Stage 12 Giro d'Italia
2002
 1st Coppa Placci
 3rd Trofeo Matteotti
 3rd Coppa Bernocchi
 4th Criterium d'Abruzzo
 5th Gran Premio Bruno Beghelli
 6th Trofeo Melinda
 10th Giro della Romagna
2003
 5th Giro del Piemonte
2004
 1st Giro di Toscana
 1st GP Kanton Aargau Gippingen
 1st Stage 1b (TTT) Settimana Internazionale di Coppi e Bartali
 2nd Giro del Veneto
 2nd Giro della Romagna
 3rd Overall Giro della Provincia di Lucca
 4th Coppa Bernocchi
 7th Gran Premio della Costa Etruschi
2006
 1st Stage 18 Tour de France
 7th Gran Premio Città di Camaiore
2007
 1st Stage 1 (TTT) Tour of Qatar
2008
 1st Stage 1 (TTT) Tour of Qatar
 4th Giro del Lazio
2009
 9th Memorial Cimurri
2011
 8th Giro del Friuli
2012
 7th Paris–Roubaix

Grand Tour general classification results timeline

References

External links

1974 births
Living people
People from Castelfranco Veneto
Italian male cyclists
Italian Tour de France stage winners
Italian Giro d'Italia stage winners
Cyclists from the Province of Treviso